Lokikirja is the fifth box set by Finnish symphonic metal band Nightwish. It was released on 18 November 2009.
This box set contains the remastered edition of Angels Fall First, the regular editions of the other six Nightwish studio albums and the special edition of Over the Hills and Far Away. The album was in pre-order at the Nightwish-Shop website. "Lokikirja" is Finnish for "logbook".

Track listing

 Angels Fall First:
Elvenpath
Beauty and the Beast
The Carpenter
Astral Romance
Angels Fall First
Tutankhamen
Nymphomaniac Fantasia
Know Why the Nightingale Sings
 Lappi (Lapland)

 Oceanborn
Stargazers
Gethsemane
Devil and the Deep Dark Ocean
Sacrament of Wilderness
Passion and the Opera
Swanheart
Moondance
The Riddler
Pharaoh Sails to Orion
Walking in the Air
Sleeping Sun

 Wishmaster
She's my Sin
The Kinslayer
Come Cover Me
Wanderlust
Two for Tragedy
Wishmaster
Bare Grace Misery
Crownless
Deep Silent Complete
Dead Boy's Poem
Fantasmic
Sleepwalker

 Over the Hills and Far Away EP
Over the Hills and Far Away
10th Man Down
Away
Astral Romance
The Kinslayer (live)
She's My Sin (live)
Sacrament of Wilderness (live)
Walking in the Air (live)
Beauty and the Beast (live)
Wishmaster (live)

 Century Child
Bless the Child
End of all Hope
Dead to the World
Ever Dream
Slaying the Dreamer
Forever Yours
Ocean Soul
Feel for You
Phantom of the Opera
Beauty of the Beast

 Bless the Child
Bless the Child
The Wayfarer
Come Cover Me (live)
Dead Boy's Poem (live)
Once Upon a Troubadour
A Return to the Sea
Sleepwalker
Nightquest

 Once
Dark Chest of Wonders
Wish I Had an Angel
Nemo
Planet Hell
Creek Mary's Blood
The Siren
Dead Gardens
Romanticide
Ghost Love Score
Kuolema Tekee Taiteilijan
Higher Than Hope

 Dark Passion Play
The Poet and the Pendulum
Bye Bye Beautiful
Amaranth
Cadence of Her Last Breath
Master Passion Greed
Eva
Sahara
Whoever Brings the Night
For the Heart I Once Had
The Islander
Last of the Wilds
7 Days to the Wolves
Meadows of Heaven

Charts

Credits
Tarja Turunen - lead vocals (on CD 1, 2, 3, 4, 5, 6 & 7)
Anette Olzon - lead vocals (on CD 8)
Tuomas Holopainen - keyboards and backing vocals
Emppu Vuorinen - lead guitars, bass guitar (on CD 1), classic guitar (on CD 8)
Jukka Nevalainen - drums
Marko Hietala - bass guitar, backing vocals (on CD 5, 6, 7 & 8)
Sami Vänskä - bass guitar (on CD 2, 3 & 4)

References

External links
Nightwish's official website

Nightwish albums
2009 compilation albums